Mustvee is a town in Mustvee Parish, Estonia.  It lies on the shore of Lake Peipus in Jõgeva County.  Its population of 1,600 is approximately half Estonian and half Russian.  The name of Mustvee was first recorded in 1343 at the time of reign of Livonian order.  It became a haven for Russian Old Believers after the Russian government declared them outlaws in 1658.  Mustvee has held fairs for the past two centuries.  Due to its position at the broadest part of the lake, this traditional fishing town is increasingly popular as a tourist centre. The new Harbour of Mustvee was opened 18 December 2014.

Climate

List of mayors of Mustvee

Gallery

References

External links

Cities and towns in Estonia
Former municipalities of Estonia
Populated places in Jõgeva County
Old Believer communities
Russians in Estonia